Juan Solanas (born 4 November 1966) is an Argentine film director, producer, screenwriter and cinematographer. 

His film Nordeste was screened in the Un Certain Regard section at the 2005 Cannes Film Festival. He directed the French-Canadian production Upside Down (2012), starring Jim Sturgess and Kirsten Dunst. He is the son of Argentinian film director and Senator Fernando "Pino" Solanas.

Filmography
 The Man Without a Head (2003)
 Nordeste (2005)
 Jack Waltzer: On the Craft of Acting (2011)
 Upside Down (2012)
 Que sea ley (2019)

References

External links

Website

1966 births
Living people
Argentine film directors
Argentine screenwriters
Male screenwriters
Argentine male writers
Argentine film producers
Argentine cinematographers
People from Buenos Aires